Henry D. Sheldon High School is a public high school in Eugene, Oregon, United States. The school's nickname is the Irish. Sheldon is one of four traditional high schools in the Eugene School District.

History
Sheldon High School opened in the 1963-64 academic year as the third high school in the Eugene School District.

The school gets its name from Dr. Henry D. Sheldon (1874–1948).

Athletics
Sheldon plays at the 6A level. After the 2002 season, the football team was ranked twenty-fourth in the nation by USA Today. Since expanding to six classifications in 2006, the Irish have made the most 6A football championship game appearances with six, winning three.

State championships
Includes team championships.

Team sports, fall
 Football: 2002, 2007, 2009, 2012
 Boys' soccer: 2002
 Girls' soccer: 2003, 2004
 Volleyball: 2022

Team sports, winter
 Boys' basketball: 1992
 Cheerleading: 2004
 Dance/drill: 
 Boys' swimming: 1975, 1986, 1987, 1988, 1991, 1993, 1996, 1999
 Girls' swimming: 1997, 1998, 2000

Team sports, spring
 Boys' track & field: 2009, 2016
 Girls' track & field: 1968
 Boys' tennis: 1971, 1972, 2001
 Girls' tennis: 1993
 Softball: 2019
 Baseball: 2013, 2015
 Boys' golf: 2005, 2006
 Girls' golf: 2013

Student media

Newspaper
The Talisman is the student newspaper. It is published twice per term. It was given the Columbia Scholastic Press Association's Silver Crown Award for high school newspapers in 1988.

Radio
Sheldon is home to KRVM (AM) and KRVM (FM), a public access radio station which includes student involvement.

Awards
Sheldon won the Oregonian Cup, an OSAA award for "overall school excellence in academics, activities, athletics and sportsmanship," in the 2001-2002 and 2002–2003 school years.

In June 2010, KGW and The Register-Guard reported that Sheldon had made Newsweeks annual list of the nation's best public high schools of the year, ranking second best in Oregon and 665th in the nation.

Notable alumni
 Jon Anderson - 1972 Summer Olympics runner, winner of 1973 Boston Marathon
 Alex Brink - quarterback, Houston Texans, Canadian Football League
 Greg Byrne - Athletic Director for the University of Alabama
 Kameron Canaday - NFL player
 Todd Christensen - football player, Los Angeles Raiders
 James Dutton - NASA astronaut pilot
 Justin Herbert - NFL quarterback for the Los Angeles Chargers
 Dave Hunt - House Speaker, Oregon House of Representatives
 Jon Jaqua - football player, Washington Redskins
 Mike Luckovich - editorial cartoonist for The Atlanta Journal-Constitution
 Chris Miller - football player, Atlanta Falcons
 Brent Primus - former Bellator MMA Lightweight Champion
 Michael Walter - football player, San Francisco 49ers
 Craig Wasson - actor
 Taylor John Williams - singer on Season 7 of The Voice

References

External links
 

High schools in Lane County, Oregon
Education in Eugene, Oregon
Public high schools in Oregon